Sasha Harrison (born 10 September 1975) is an Irish equestrian. She competed in two events at the 2004 Summer Olympics.

References

External links
 

1975 births
Living people
Irish female equestrians
Olympic equestrians of Ireland
Equestrians at the 2004 Summer Olympics
People from Craigavon, County Armagh